The eleventh cycle of Britain's Next Top Model premiered on 16 March 2017 on Lifetime. The judging panel from the show's previous cycle remained unchanged. This cycle introduced challenges in which contestants could be granted immunity during their weekly eliminations. 22 year-old Talulah-Eve Brown made history in the series after being the first openly transgender contestant to compete on the show.

The prizes for this cycle included a modelling contract with Models 1, a fashion spread in Cosmopolitan magazine, nation-wide advertising campaigns for Sleek Makeup and Paul Edmonds along with a yearly supply of both brand's products, as well as additional campaigns for  Colgate, Dorothy Perkins, and boohoo.

The winner of the competition was 18-year-old Olivia Wardell from Romsey, Hampshire.

Cast

Contestants
(Ages stated are at start of contest)

Judges
Abbey Clancy (host)
Hilary Alexander
Nicky Johnston
Paul Sculfor

Episodes

Results

 The contestant was immune from elimination
 The contestant was eliminated
 The contestant withdrew from the competition
 The contestant won the competition

Bottom two/three

 The contestant was eliminated after her first time in the bottom two/three
 The contestant was eliminated after her second time in the bottom two/three
 The contestant was eliminated after her third time in the bottom two/three
 The contestant was eliminated after her fifth time in the bottom two/three
 The contestant was eliminated in the final judging and placed third
 The contestant was eliminated in the final judging and placed as the runner-up

Average  call-out order
Final two is not included.

Notes

References

External links 
 Official website

11
2017 British television seasons
2017 Irish television seasons
Television shows filmed in England
Television shows filmed in Cape Verde